Katonah station is a commuter rail stop on the Metro-North Railroad's Harlem Line, located in Katonah, New York.

As is the case with Brewster, Katonah is not far from the Connecticut border and sees a sizeable number of commuters from Ridgefield using Katonah for commuting as opposed to the Danbury Branch of the New Haven Line given that Katonah gives a faster, direct trip to Grand Central. Similarly, Housatonic Area Regional Transit has a shuttle connecting Ridgefield to Katonah station during peak hours which also connects to Bee-Line Route 19 to Ossining.

The station was also formerly known as Mechanicsville.

History

The original depot at Katonah was moved from its location in "Old Katonah" in 1897, prior to the flooding of the Croton River valley for the New Croton Reservoir, which is today a private residence in the village of Katonah. A second station (picture on the left) was built in 1910 to replace it. In 1954, New York Central closed the ticket agency in the Katonah station, and the building was later sold to private owners. A small waiting room was maintained for passengers through 1984, when Metro-North opened its new station immediately north of Jay Street crossing. A bridge over the Muscoot Reservoir for Lakeside Road north of the Lakeside Road parking lot was converted into a connecting ramp from Interstate 684 at the southbound on-ramp of exit 6, but was later closed.

Station layout
The station has one eight-car-long high-level island platform serving trains in both directions. Like Brewster, there is a grade crossing adjacent, just to the south of the station. It remains closed the entire time a southbound train is at the station. Similar to both Brewster and Croton Falls, it is right in the village's downtown business district.

References

External links

Katonah Metro-North and New York Central Stations (Road and Rail Pictures)

Metro-North Railroad stations in New York (state)
Railway stations in Westchester County, New York
Former New York Central Railroad stations
Railway stations in the United States opened in 1847
Transportation in Westchester County, New York
1847 establishments in New York (state)